A number of ships have been named United States , after the United States.

Merchant ships
 , an American trans-Atlantic sidewheel, built by William H Webb in New York
 , a British passenger cargo of Anchor Line, Glasgow, wrecked in 1861 
 , an American cargo steamship lost in 1881
 , a Danish passenger-cargo liner of the Scandinavian American Line, scrapped in 1935
 , an American passenger ferry of the Indiana Transportation Company
  (1951), an American retired ocean liner of United States Line, and Blue Ribband holder

Naval ships  
 was one of the original six frigates that served from 1798 until 1865.
USS United States (CC-6) was a  canceled and scrapped when the vessel was only 12 percent complete.
 was an aircraft carrier canceled five days after her keel was laid down in 1949. The ship would have been the lead ship under the United States-class aircraft carrier.
 USS United States was to have been the eighth  aircraft carrier, but renamed  in 1995.

References

External links
 

Ship names